

Mixed team event
For 2010 YOG FIE introduced completely new format competitions for teams, where their composition will be determined by the results achieved during the individual events. The best fencers ranked in each weapon from different NOCs will form the top team of each continent as follows: Europe 1, Europe 2, Europe 3, Europe 4, Asia 1, Asia 2, Americas 1, Americas 2, Africa.

Bracket

References

Fencing at the 2010 Summer Youth Olympics